Bhorer Kagoj ( Bhorer Kagoj "Dawn's Paper") is a major Bengali-language daily newspaper, published from Dhaka,  Bangladesh. The newspaper is published in both print and online formats.

History 
Bhorer Kagoj began publications on 15 February 1992.

Editors 
Naimul Islam Khan was the founding editor of the newspaper. Then Matiur Rahman took charge of the newspaper, followed by Benazir Ahmed, Abed Khan, and current editor Shyamal Dutta.

See also
 List of newspapers in Bangladesh

References

External links

Bengali-language newspapers published in Bangladesh
Daily newspapers published in Bangladesh
Publications established in 1992
Newspapers published in Dhaka